David Bueso Guerrero (born 5 May 1955) is a Honduran football midfielder who was a non-playing squad member of Honduras at the 1982 FIFA World Cup.

Club career
Bueso has played for F.C. Motagua for whom he scored 8 career goals. He won the Honduran league title with Motagua in the 1978-79 season.

International career
He has represented his country in 3 FIFA World Cup qualification matches, scoring 2 goals in the process.

International goals
Scores and results list Honduras' goal tally first.

References

External links

1955 births
Living people
Association football midfielders
Honduran footballers
Honduras international footballers
F.C. Motagua players
1982 FIFA World Cup players
CONCACAF Championship-winning players